Vusal Abdullazade – Vusal Abdullazade (born September 12, 1992 in Azerbaijan, Ismayilli region)-is an Azerbaijani karate fighter, three-time World champion, European Championship silver medalist, seven-time Azerbaijani champion, President and Chief Instructor of the Baku Karate-do Academy, The President of Azerbaijan Fudokan Federation, a young public figure Vusal Abdullazade

Early life

Azerbaijani karate fighter of Dagestan origin, World and European champion, winner of high-level international competitions, Vusal Abdullazade was born on September 12, 1992 in Tirjan village, Ismayilli region. In 2011 he entered the Azerbaijan State Academy of Physical Education and Sports out of competition by the order of President Ilham Aliyev for his high sports degrees and graduated from the Academy in June 2015 with honors.
In 2015–2016, he served in the N Military Unit of the Armed Forces of Azerbaijan, located on the front line, and often received awards for military service and discipline. He participated in the April 2016 Battles.
Since August, 25, 2016, he is the chief instructor and president of Baku Karate-do Academy. He is an international grade V DAN Black Belt holder(master).

In 2011, at the age of 19, he was awarded with the title of Sport Master of Azerbaijan Republic. 

On February 9, 2020, he was a candidate in the Extraordinary Parliamentary Elections of National Assembly of Azerbaijan Republic.

Work and career

 He is a three-time world champion and silver and bronze medalist of the world championships, as well as a silver and bronze medalist of the European championship.

  He is 5th DAN international grade black belt holder and International-class Sport Master. 

 From September 1, 2013 to July 1, 2016, he served as Secretary General at Azerbaijan Professional Karate-do Federation.

 From July 10, 2016 to May 1, 2017, he served as Vice President of Azerbaijan Professional Karate-Do Federation. He is also the head and chief instructor of the Baku Karate-Do Academy. 
 2021, 27 avgust - 5th Dan Black belt of WFF.

Successes:
 2007 Georgia Open Caucasus Championship – Gold medal
 2008 Ukraine International Tournament – Gold Medal
 2008 Indian Mumbai Open – Bronze medal 
 2009 Russian World Martial Arts Competitions- Gold medal
 2009 Hungary World Cup – Bronze medal
 2011 Serbian European Championship – Silver medal
 2011 Ukraine World Championship – Gold medal
 2012 Turkey Istanbul European Championship – Silver medal
 2013 Azerbaijan Open European Championship and Cup – Silver medal
 2013 Polish World Championship – Gold medal
 2014 Portugal World Championship – Silver medal
 2018 Ukraine World Championship- Gold medal.

External links
Bakı Karate-do Akademiyasının prezidentindən illik HESABAT
Bakı Karate-do Akademiyasının prezidenti Vüsal Abdullazadədən illik HESABAT
Vüsal Abdullazadə: Əsas məqsədimiz ölkəmizi dünya kubokunda layiqincə təmsil etməkdir
Zəfər Gününə həsr edilmiş karate üzrə birinci açıq respublika turniri keçirilib
Vüsal Abdullazadə 7-ci dəfə Respublika çempion oldu
İdmançılarımız dünya çempionatında qələbə qazandı- FOTOLAR
Gənclər və İdman Nazirliyində Dünya Fudokan Federasiyasının rəsmiləri ilə görüş keçirilib
Bakıda fudokan üzrə beynəlxalq seminarın açılış mərasimi keçirilib
Azərbaycan idmançısı dünya çempionu oldu
 Official Results World All-Styles Championships 2014 – Portugal 
Vusal Abdullazade - World championship - Gold Medal

References

1992 births
Living people
Azerbaijani male karateka
Azerbaijani martial artists
Azerbaijani sportsmen